Dariusz Kuć (born 24 April 1986) is a Polish sprint athlete. His personal best time over 100 metres is 10.15 seconds, achieved in June 2011 in Kraków.

At the 2006 European Athletics Championships he finished sixth in the 100 metres final and won a silver medal, running the anchor leg, in the 4 × 100 m relay. He also competed at the 2006 World Indoor Championships, the 2007 World Championships and the 2008 Olympic Games without reaching the final. However, in Beijing he qualified for the second round after finishing fifth in his heat behind Asafa Powell, Kim Collins, Craig Pickering and Daniel Grueso. His time of 10.44 was the 9th fastest losing time after the 10.25 of Nobuharu Asahara, advancing him to the second round. In that second round he only came to 10.46 seconds, which was the seventh time of the heat, causing elimination. Together with Marcin Nowak, Łukasz Chyła and Marcin Jędrusiński he also competed at the 4×100 metres relay. In their qualification heat they did not finish due to a mistake in the baton exchange and they were eliminated.

Achievements

References

External links
 
 

1986 births
Living people
Polish male sprinters
Athletes (track and field) at the 2008 Summer Olympics
Athletes (track and field) at the 2012 Summer Olympics
Olympic athletes of Poland
Sportspeople from Kraków
European Athletics Championships medalists
Universiade medalists in athletics (track and field)
Zawisza Bydgoszcz athletes
Universiade silver medalists for Poland
Universiade bronze medalists for Poland
Medalists at the 2013 Summer Universiade
Medalists at the 2009 Summer Universiade
21st-century Polish people